The Lime Rock Grand Prix (2010 name: Memorial Day Classic) is a sports car race held at Lime Rock Park in Lakeville, Connecticut, United States on the Memorial Day weekend. It had been a part of the Grand-Am Rolex Sports Car Series,  SCCA National Sports Car Championship, USAC Road Racing Championship, Trans-Am Series, IMSA GT Championship and United States Road Racing Championship.  The revived version in 2017 is for the United States Auto Club Pirelli World Challenge.

Winners

External links
World Sports Racing Prototypes: SCCA Nationals archive
World Sports Racing Prototypes: IMSA archive
World Sports Racing Prototypes: USRRC archive
World Sports Racing Prototypes: Grand-Am archive
Racing Sports Cars: Lime Rock archive
Ultimate Racing History: Lime Rock archive

IMSA GT Championship races
Grand-Am races
Recurring sporting events established in 1957
Motorsport in Connecticut